Jan D'Alquen and Ron Eveslage are American cinematographers best known for their work with film director George Lucas on the sleeper hit film, 1973's American Graffiti.

American Graffiti is a nostalgic portrait of teenage life in 1962 which spawned numerous imitations such as the TV series, Happy Days, and films like The Lords of Flatbush. The budget of American Graffiti was a mere $750,000 dollars, on a tight 28-day shooting schedule. Nonetheless, the film went on to gross more than $55 million, making it a blockbuster of its day.

American Graffiti was shot entirely on location in small Northern California towns between the cruising hours of 9:00 p.m., when it was just dark enough, and 5:00 a.m., before the sun would come up. The crew experienced hardships on the low budget shoot, including difficulties with lighting the set, and having to also brave the extreme Northern California cold during the continuous night shoot. Lucas himself has said that it was a hectic shoot and that he had felt rushed by the tight schedule. According to Lucas, a typical night on the set was one when the assistant cameraman had to be hospitalized after he was run over by one of the cars and then the crew would have to put out a five-alarm fire.

Filmography
American Graffiti (1973)
It Ain't Easy (1972)

References

External links
Turner Classic Movies "American Graffiti" 

American cinematographers
Living people
Year of birth missing (living people)